Cagayan de Oro (CDO), officially the City of Cagayan de Oro, is a 1st class highly urbanized city in the region of Northern Mindanao, Philippines. It is the capital of the province of Misamis Oriental where it is geographically situated but governed administratively independent from the provincial government. According to the 2020 census, it has a population of 728,402 people.
Cagayan de Oro also serves as the regional center and business hub of Northern Mindanao, and part of the growing Metropolitan Cagayan de Oro area, which includes the city of El Salvador, the towns of Opol, Alubijid, Laguindingan, Gitagum, Lugait, Naawan, Initao, Libertad and Manticao at the western side, and the towns of Tagoloan, Villanueva, Jasaan, Claveria and Balingasag at the eastern side.

Cagayan de Oro is located along the north central coast of Mindanao island facing Macajalar Bay and is bordered by the municipalities of Opol to the west, Tagoloan to the east, and the provinces of Bukidnon and Lanao del Norte to the south of the city. According to the 2020 census, the city has a population of 728,402, making it the 10th most populous city in the Philippines.

Cagayan de Oro is also famous for its white water rafting or kayaking adventures, one of the tourism activities being promoted along the Cagayan de Oro River.

Etymology

The name Cagayan de Oro (lit. River of Gold) can be traced back to the arrival of the Spanish Augustinian Recollect friars in 1622, the area around Himologan (now Huluga), was already known as "Cagayán". Early Spanish written documents in the 16th century already referred to the place as "Cagayán".

The region of Northern Mindanao, which included Cagayan de Oro, was granted as encomienda to a certain Don Juan Griego on January 25, 1571. It was then former Vice President of the Philippines Emmanuel Peláez who appended "de Oro" to Cagayan.

The name "Cagayan" is shared by other places in the Philippines; these include the province of Cagayan in northern Luzon, the Cagayan Islands in the northern Sulu Sea, and the former Cagayan de Sulu, currently named Mapun, an island in Tawi-Tawi.

History

Classical period
The Cagayan de Oro area was continuously inhabited by Late Neolithic to Iron Age Austronesian cultures. The oldest human remains discovered was from the Huluga Caves, once used as a burial place by the natives. A skullcap sent to the Scripps Institution of Oceanography in 1977 was dated to be from between 350 and 377 AD.

The caves have yielded numerous artifacts, but most areas have been badly damaged by guano collectors and amateur treasure hunters. Associated with the cave is the Huluga Open Site, believed to be the site of the primary pre-colonial settlement in the region identified as  "Himologan" by the first Spanish missionaries. The site is located about eight kilometers from present-day Cagayan de Oro.

The discovery of a grave site in 2009 uncovered remains of Song Dynasty (960–1279 AD) celadon ware and Sukhothai period (1238–1347 AD) Sangkhalok ceramic ware, in addition to body ornaments and stone tools. It indicates that the region was part of the ancient maritime trading network of Southeast Asia. Skulls recovered from the sites show that native Kagay-anons practiced artificial cranial deformation since childhood as a mark of social status, similar to skulls from archeological sites in neighboring Butuan.

The Huluga Open Site was extensively damaged in 2001 to give way to a bridge project by the local administration. It was the source of controversy when a team from the University of the Philippines-Archaeological Studies Program dismissed the archeological importance of the site by declaring it as a "camp-like area" and not a settlement and thus not worthy of heritage protection under the laws. It was alleged by local conservationists that the UP-ASP team were influenced by the local government so the bridge project could continue. The site is still not protected and continues to be quarried, despite protests by local historians and archeologists.

Colonial period

Spanish period
The Himologan settlement was still occupied by the time the Europeans made contact. In 1622, two Spanish Augustinian Recollect missionaries reached the settlement and described it as being inhabited by a mixed stock descended from highlander Bukidnon Lumad and sea-faring Visayans ("Dumagat"). They described the men of the settlement as being tattooed like other Visayans and the women as being ornamented with intricate jewelry, some of which were golden. They also identified them as animists, practicing traditional anitism, though they paid tribute to Muhammad Kudarat, the sultan of the Islamized Sultanate of Maguindanao to the south.

In 1626, Fray Agustín de San Pedro persuaded the chief of Himologan, Datu Salangsang, to transfer his settlement down the Cagayan River, to the present-day Gaston Park. De San Pedro later fortified the new settlement against Sultan Kudarat's raiders.

In 1738, Spanish dominance was felt in Cagayan de Oro. When Misamis gained the status of province in 1818, one of its four districts was the Partidos de Cagayan. In 1871, the "Partidos" became a town and was made a permanent capital of Misamis.

On February 27, 1872, Governor-General Carlos María de La Torre issued a decree declaring Cagayan the permanent capital of Segundo Distrito de Misamis. During this era, the name of the town was known as Cagayan de Misamis.

In 1883, the town became a seat of the Spanish government in Mindanao for the provinces of Misamis Oriental, Misamis Occidental, Bukidnon and Lanao del Norte.

On January 10, 1899, Cagayan de Misamis joined the government of Emilio Aguinaldo and celebrated its independence from Spain. It was the second time the Aguinaldo government was declared and the new Philippine flag raised on Mindanao island. By virtue of the 1898 Treaty of Paris, Spain ceded the Philippines to the United States; this caused friction and resulted in the Philippine–American War.

American period

On March 31, 1900, Americans occupied the town of Cagayan de Misamis and on April 7, 1900, a battle erupted in the town center led by General Nicolas Capistrano and Filipino resistance fighters. This would later become known as the Battle of Cagayan de Misamis. The Americans won the war, and about forty years later, gave the Philippines its independence on July 4, 1946. The war years in Cagayan de Oro were prompted by the presence of the Americans in 1898. The Americans were initially and successfully repulsed by the Kagay-anons forces led by Mayor Don Apolinar Vélez at the historic Battle of Makahambus on June 4, 1900.

After the troubled years, peace finally brought back the economic activities to normality under the guidance of the United States. Consequently, from a purely farming-fishing area, Cagayan de Oro emerged into a booming commerce and trade center.

Japanese period and second American period
On May 3, 1942, American and Philippine forces fought heroically against invading Japanese forces from Panay. Unable to resist the overwhelming and the better supplied Japanese, the allied forces retreated to more defensive positions outside the city. The Japanese burned most of the city and took up residence at the Ateneo de Cagayan University, now Xavier University Grade School and used the ferry crossing near San Agustin Church.

The Japanese army implemented a scorch-earth policy. Filipino and American guerrilla forces fought back during this occupation and American planes bombed both the university and San Agustin church on October 10, 1944. The Japanese were never able to successfully move outside the city for any length of time due to the constant pressure and attacks from the Philippine resistant movement. Combined American and Free Philippine forces landed in Cagayan de Oro on May 10, 1945, three years and 7 days after the Japanese occupation.

During this period the Japanese committed many atrocities against the local population of Cagayan de Oro, as they did throughout the Philippines. Colonel Fumio Suzuki and two hundred of his men escaped capture during the liberation of the city and withdrew into the mountainous jungle. They were caught two years later; only 38 survived by cannibalizing the Higaonon tribal people. At least 70 people were eaten.

A Cagayanon, the physician Antonio Julian Montalvan, was a member of an espionage team working for the return of Gen. Douglas MacArthur to the Philippines. Later, he became part of a Manila spy network. He was captured, tortured and decapitated by the Japanese.

Postwar era

In 1948, the barrios of El Salvador and Molugan with their sitios known as Sala, Sambulawan, Sinaloc, Lagtang, Talaba, Kalabaylabay and Hinigdaan were separated from Cagayan de Oro to form the town of El Salvador.

In 1950, the barrios of Opol, Igpit, and Lower Iponan (now Barangay Barra) were separated from Cagayan de Oro to form the town of Opol.

On June 15, 1950, President Elpidio Quirino signed Republic Act No. 521, which granted the status of a chartered city to the Municipality of Cagayan de Misamis. This was made possible through the efforts of then Cagayan de Oro Congressman Emmanuel Pelaez.

Martial law era

During the martial law era, Cagayan de Oro was not spared from military bombings and the usage of brutal mechanisms against dissenters of the Marcos regime. By the time martial law ended, more than a thousand people from the city had been tortured, raped, electrocuted, or salvaged.

Cagayan de Oro did not take these violations lightly, and the city came to have a reputation as one of the centers of political opposition in the Philippines.

Cagayan de Oro was declared a highly urbanized city by the Ministry of Local Government on November 22, 1983. In 1986, the city participated in the People Power Revolution through rallies in the streets of the city. When the revolution succeeded and ousted Marcos from power in Manila, the city was among those who supported the installation of Corazon Aquino as president.

Recent history
In 1992, the National Museum of the Philippines recognized the archaeological value of Huluga when it gave the Open Site and caves separate accession numbers. In 1999, however, mayor Vicente Y. Emano conceived the plan to bulldoze Huluga to give way to a road-and-bridge project. The project was stopped in 2001, but was eventually continued in 2002. The construction destroyed at least 60% of the archaeological site's open area, where the majority of artifacts can be found. Protests against the heritage destruction was made by cultural experts, but nothing happened with their plea.

In 2003, the Heritage Conservation Advocates (HCA) went to the open area of Huluga for a scientific surface investigation and managed to find earthenware, Chinese pottery sherds, obsidian flakes, animal bones, an ancient Spanish coin, and a whale harpoon similar to those being used in Lomblen Island, Indonesia. The newly discovered artifacts proved that there are still many artifacts that can be found in the area. This caused the HCA to file a case against Emano and the contractor, UKC Builders, before the Environmental Management Bureau (EMB). However, the construction continued and was inaugurated in September 2003 by Emano.

A day later, president Gloria Macapagal Arroyo made a speech in UNESCO about her administration's gains in cultural conservation. In January 2004, the city council enacted an ordinance that authorized Emano to sign a contract with the Archaeological Studies Program (ASP) of the University of the Philippines to do salvage archaeology in Huluga and vicinities. The program did not make cooperative linkages with existing archeological programs from Xavier University. The ASP declared that the site was an ancient camp, not a settlement, due to their findings in the destroyed archaeological site. The report did not consider the findings of Xavier University. The issue later climbed into the Philippine Senate, where Loren Legarda issued a resolution for investigation of the matter, but the investigation was never approved by the other members of the Senate. The artifacts found in the Huluga Caves and its destroyed open site from 1992 to 2003 are housed in Xavier University, Capitol University, and the University of the Philippines.

Notable calamities

On the evening of December 16–17, 2011, Tropical Storm Sendong (international name Washi) caused widespread flash flooding in Northern Mindanao. In Cagayan de Oro, hundreds living near the banks of the Cagayan de Oro River were killed, with hundreds still missing.

Officials said that despite government warning, some people did not evacuate. Five people were killed in a landslide, while others died in the flash floods which occurred overnight, following 10 hours of rain, compounded by overflowing rivers and tributaries. Most of the victims had been sleeping.

In some areas, up to 20 centimeters of rain fell in 24 hours. More than 2,000 were rescued, according to the Armed Forces of the Philippines (AFP), and at least 20,000 people were staying in 10 evacuation centers in Cagayan de Oro. Officials were also investigating reports that an entire village was swept away. The confirmed death toll from the disaster is 1,268.

In January 2017, Cagayan de Oro, along with other parts of Visayas and Mindanao, was impacted by a combination of a low-pressure area and the tail-end of a cold front. The heavy rain inundated many streets, stranding many commuters. At the University of Science and Technology of Southern Philippines (USTP), about 900–1,000 students were trapped as most of their campus was flooded. The students were forced to climb to the upper floors of the school's buildings and wait until rescue arrived. The city's shopping malls on Claro M. Recto Avenue were also severely affected, with Limketkai Center completely inundated by the floodwaters. A basement parking area of a mall at the corner of Corrales St. was covered with water, while another one near Bitan-ag Creek was flooded as well, even though the area was elevated.

On December 21, 2017, Typhoon Vinta (international name Tembin) impacted most of Mindanao. It made its landfall in the Davao Region. Three bridges were closed due to rising water levels in Cagayan de Oro, where 1,719 individuals were forced to evacuate. Roughly 30,000 people were either stranded in ports or stayed in evacuation centers while 22,000 people moved to higher grounds due to heavy flooding.

Geography

Cagayan de Oro is located along the north central coast of Mindanao, the second-largest island in the Philippine archipelago.

The southern part of the city is bordered by the provinces of Bukidnon and Lanao del Norte. The municipality of Opol borders the city on the west and Tagoloan, Misamis Oriental to the east. To the north lies Macajalar Bay facing the Bohol Sea.

Its total land area is 488.86 km2 representing 13.9 percent of the entire Misamis Oriental province. It includes 25 kilometers of coastline and a harbor, Macajalar Bay. Approximately 44.7 percent of Cagayan de Oro is classified as agricultural land, while 38.4 percent is classified as open spaces.

The city is frequently categorized and referenced according to geographic factors: the 1st District (west of the Cagayan River) consisting of 24 barangays which are mostly suburban, and the 2nd District (east of the river), made up of 17 barangays, including city proper barangays numbering from 1–40.

Climate

Under the Köppen climate classification system, Cagayan de Oro has a tropical monsoon climate (Am) with an annual average temperature of 28 °C. In June 1998, the city recorded its highest temperature to date of 39 °C.

Cagayan de Oro does not receive an even amount of rainfall throughout the year. The driest months are March and April while August and September are the wettest months. The rainy or wet season lasts from June until November with the relatively drier seasons lasting from December until May. The city lies outside the typhoon belt but is affected by the Inter-Tropical Convergence Zone.

Demographics

According to the 2020 census, it has a population of 728,402 people, making it the 10th most populous city in the Philippines.

About 44% of the household population in Cagayan de Oro classified themselves as ethnically mixed people, 22.15% as Cebuano, 4.38% as Boholano, while 28.07% as other ethnic groups (as of 2000 census).

Religion

Roman Catholicism

Roman Catholicism is the city's dominant religion, represented by almost 70 percent of the population. It is administered by the Archdiocese of Cagayan de Oro, which comprises the three civil provinces of Misamis Oriental, Bukidnon, and Camiguin in Northern Mindanao, as well as the entire Caraga region. It is a metropolitan seat on the island of Mindanao.

The current Archbishop of Cagayan de Oro is the Most Reverend José Araneta Cabantan, S.S.J.V., D.D., who was installed on August 28, 2020. His seat is located at the Saint Augustine Metropolitan Cathedral.

Black Nazarene shrine
In 2009, the Minor Basilica of the Black Nazarene in Quiapo, Manila decided to move the replica statue of the Black Nazarene to the Archdiocesan Shrine of the Black Nazarene (Jesus Nazareno Parish Church), located along Claro M. Recto Avenue. This was so that Black Nazarene devotees from Mindanao do not have to travel to Quiapo for their annual pilgrimage. To this day, it hosts the largest traslación parade in all of Mindanao.

In September 2018, the Jesus Nazareno Parish Church underwent year-long physical renovations to make its façade look more like the very basilica in Quiapo itself.

Protestant and Evangelical Christianity
Protestant missionary activity in the city started in 1916, although it has grown in numbers over recent decades. One of the known Protestant groups in the city is Pentecostalism, which dramatically increased with 2.8 percent of the total population. About 20 churches have settled in the metropolitan area. Celebration International Church has one of the highest member attendances with a record of 735 members.

In addition, three main Pentecostal mother churches are situated in the suburban area and few in the metropolitan areas. Meanwhile, Adventists, Latter-day Saints, Lutherans, and Methodists have lately grown in numbers within the suburban areas.

Other Christian churches include the Iglesia ni Cristo, the Iglesia Filipina Independiente, the United Church of Christ in the Philippines, Christ's Commission Fellowship, Victory Christian Fellowship, Baptists, Reformed churches, and the Jesus Miracle Crusade.

Islam
Islam is practiced mainly by Maranao settlers and the Balik Islam ("reverts"). Majority of the Muslim population consists of immigrants from nearby Iligan and Marawi, where they travel to work, engage in business, and study. It has increased over the years due to conflicts in the Bangsamoro region, most recently the Marawi siege that started on May 23, 2017.

There are several large mosques and about 50 small mosques that can be found in the city, as well as Muslim prayer rooms or musallas in some schools, malls, ports of entry, Halal restaurants, and government buildings. Masjid Oro Jammah, located in the corner of Aguinaldo and Domingo Velez streets, is the oldest mosque in the city, founded in 1930. Masjid Sharif Alawi in Barangay Balulang is the largest mosque in Northern Mindanao, with over 3,200 square meters in land area, which also includes a madrasa and seminar building.

During the Eid holidays, the Pelaéz Sports Complex is a known place for hosting the annual Salatul Eid.

Other religions
Buddhism and Taoism are practiced by majority of local Chinese. Some are even members of the local chapter of the Bell Church in Barangay Macasandig.

Languages
Cebuano is the primarily spoken language in the city. Tagalog serves as the secondary language. English is mainly used for business and in the academe. Maranao is widely spoken by the city's Muslim community, majority of whom are ethnic Maranaos. Subanen, Binukid, Higaonon, and Hiligaynon are also spoken to varying degrees by their respective communities within the city.

Economy

Cagayan de Oro is the regional center and logistics and business hub of Northern Mindanao. The city's economy is largely based on industry, commerce, trade, service and tourism. Investment in Cagayan de Oro City for the first six months of 2012 reached 7.4 billion pesos outpacing the local government's expectation of to nearly 100 percent. Investments in the city are dominated by malls, high-rise hotels and condominiums and convention centers. The net income for 2012 pegged at 2,041,036,807.89 billion pesos.

It noted the United Nations cited Cagayan de Oro City in 2014 as “emerging city of tomorrow,” owing to its strong fundamentals that help strengthen its position as an emerging business leader in Mindanao.

FWD Life Philippines President and CEO Peter Grimes said that Cagayan de Oro City is emerging as the economic and financial center of Mindanao due to the city's conducive peace and order condition, its stable power supply, its readily available and well-trained human resource, government efficiency and appropriate infrastructure.

Cagayan de Oro is home of the multi-billion peso fuel import facility of Pilipinas Shell Petroleum Corporation, dubbed as the North Mindanao Import Facility (NMIF).

In 2018, during the 6th Regional Competitiveness Summit organized by the Department of Trade and Industry, Cagayan de Oro was named as the country's “Top 5 Most Competitive City” in the highly urbanized cities category, notching five ranks higher as compared to its overall ranking last year outranking the country's top financial center, Makati, which ranked sixth.

Big industries and homegrown industries 
Cagayan de Oro is the home of multinational companies, like Del Monte, Nestle, Liwayway Marketing Corporation (goes by a more well-known name, Oishi), Unipace Corporation (a multi-national company carrying the Gaisano Group), Philip Morris Fortune Tobacco Inc. (PMFTC), Madison Shopping and Supervalue, Inc. (runs all SM Malls and Savemore Supermarkets and also into heavy manufacturing and distribution).

Bank industry 
Cagayan de Oro, as the regional economic center of Northern Mindanao, houses the Cagayan de Oro Branch of the Bangko Sentral ng Pilipinas (Central Bank of the Philippines). As of December 2019, at least 143 banks are operating in the city.

Automobile industry

Cagayan de Oro has a wide variety of car brands like Toyota, Honda, Nissan, Isuzu, Mitsubishi, Suzuki, Ford, Kia, Foton, Mazda, Chevrolet, BMW, Peugeot, Hyundai, Subaru, Chery, Jinbei, Tata, Hino and Volkswagen have set up dealerships in the city. Most of the car showrooms are located along the Iligan-Cagayan de Oro-Butuan Road.

MAN has their CDO showroom at nearby town of Opol. Monark Equipment has one-hectare equipment yard in El Salvador, Misamis Oriental, which is just a 16-minute drive away from Cagayan de Oro.

Auto Hardware and car accessory stores for all types of cars and vehicles are abounding in Cagayan de Oro. A long stretch of auto hardware stores for parts and supplies are located along Osmeňa Street.

Retail industry 

Limketkai Center which has two shopping malls (Limketkai M & Robinsons CDO Mall) host many flagship tenants which include two Robinsons Supermarket branches (on both malls: one inside Limketkai Mall's South Concourse and another at the 2nd Floor of Robinsons CDO Mall), then there is also Shopwise Supermarket at the East Concourse, another Robinsons Supermarket stand-alone branch in Barangay Gusa, stand-alone department stores (Robinsons, SM, Gaisano and Ororama), two SM Malls (one at SM City Uptown and then the SM CDO Downtown Premier), Ayala Malls' Centrio (which host flagship tenants Rustan's Market & Robinsons Department Store), Gaisano City Malls, large grocery stores, 24-hour convenience stores (30 outlets of 7-Eleven, several local stores of Chams and Grams, Mercury Drug and Rose Pharmacy convenience stores) and two CityMall stores (one at Iponan and the other at Bulua, opened in the last quarter of 2018), offering local and imported products. Stores owned by local, national and foreign Chinese, Taiwanese and Korean businessmen, are abounding in the city.

Gas refilling stations as sub-sector of retail are all over the city. These are distributed by Shell, Caltex, Petron, Blu Energy, Phoenix, Jetti and Geo Gas.

Business process outsourcing

Business process outsourcing (BPO) in Cagayan de Oro is booming due to ample supply of human capital supported by available health, research, educational, and modern telecommunication facilities. The increase of BPO companies in the city has led to new buildings and zones dedicated for contact centers which are all PEZA registered.

Cooperative business
Cagayan de Oro is home to cooperatives that provide employment, economic assistance, and considered one of the prime drivers of the city's economy. The extension office of Cooperative Development Authority, located in the city as the center of Northern Mindanao (Region X), provides technical advisory services, regulatory services, and online application processing.

The big names of Cooperatives located in Cagayan de Oro are:
 Philippine Federation of Credit Cooperatives Mindanao League – a federation of cooperatives in the Philippines
 MASS-SPECC Cooperative Development Center – a federation of cooperatives in the Philippines
 First Community Cooperative (FICCO – formerly Ateneo Community Credit Union) – a billionaire cooperative covering the entire of Mindanao
 Oro Integrated Cooperative – consisting of more than 100,000 strong members of farmers, fisher folk, women, workers, vendors, drivers, government employees scattered in Cagayan de Oro and the provinces of Misamis Oriental, Bukidnon and Tagbilaran City who are engaged in small and micro enterprises
 ACDI Multipurpose Cooperative – preferred brand of financial services in the Armed Forces of the Philippines
 Asian Business Cabletow Cooperative Academy (ABCCA) – provides access to and quality of education for the less-privileged students
 CFI Community Cooperative
 Coop-Life Mutual Benefit Services (CLIMBS Life and General Insurance Cooperative) – owned by over 2000 cooperatives in the Philippines since 1971
 Oro Savings & Sharing Cooperative
 Cooperative Bank of Misamis Oriental – with 268 cooperatives and Samahang Nayon as member-incorporators

Government

Elected and appointed public officials have governed Cagayan de Oro since June 15, 1950, with a strong mayor-council government. The city political government is composed of the mayor, vice mayor, two congressional districts representatives, sixteen councilors, one Sangguniang Kabataan (SK) Federation representative and an Association of Barangay Captains (ABC) representative. Each official is elected publicly to a three-year terms.

The following are the current city officials of Cagayan de Oro:
House of Representatives
 1st Legislative district: Rep. Lordan G. Suan (Padayon Pilipino)
 2nd Legislative district: Rep. Rufus B. Rodriguez (CDP)
Mayor: Rolando A. Uy (NUP)
Vice Mayor: Jocelyn B. Rodriguez (CDP)

Barangays and legislative districts

Cagayan de Oro is politically subdivided into 80 barangays. These are grouped into two congressional districts, 24 barangays in the 1st district (West) and 56 barangays in the 2nd district (East), with the Cagayan de Oro River as the natural boundary. The city has a 57 urbanized barangays and 23 rural barangays all in all.

Culture and arts

There are several notable events in the city. Each barangay or barrio has its own feast locally known as Fiesta (or festivals) honoring their patron saints after achieving recognition in their own rights.

The Higalaay Festival (formerly the Kagay-an Festival, then the Higalaay Kagay-an Festival) is a week-long celebration in honor of Cagayan de Oro's patron saint St. Augustine held every August.

Highlights of the Higalaay Festival are the Kahimunan Trade Fair, which features the native products of the city and province, particularly agricultural, Miss Cagayan de Oro, Folkloric Street Dancing Competition featuring colorful attires and cultural dances of the Higaonon tribes, Higalas Parade of Cagayan de Oro Icons and Floats, Halad sa Lambagohan, PE Rhythmic Dance Competition, Kalo Festival and Kumbira, a culinary show and exhibit that started in 1996 by Kagay-anons hoteliers and restaurants. It has since evolved over the years and now hosts a culinary competition among students and professionals from all over Mindanao. The competition is divided into students and professionals where hotel and restaurant management schools and professional chefs compete against each other in their respective categories. There are also cultural shows, competitions and celebrity concerts. In more recent years, some of these competitions have been replaced with new ones, such as the Folkloric Street Dancing Competition, which was replaced by the Cagayan de Oro Carnival Parade in 2014.

The annual religious tradition of the Feast of the Black Nazarene in Cagayan de Oro City is held every January 9 by having a procession called “Traslacion” in which hundreds of thousands of devotees participate. Cagayan de Oro is one of only three sites in the country to have this ‘Traslacion’.

"Himugso", which means birth, is a week-long celebration of Cagayan de Oro's Charter Day and Philippine Independence Day. Cagayan de Oro's cityhood was established on June 15, 1950. Independence Day is the national commemoration of the Philippine Declaration of Independence from Spain on June 12, 1898. Both Charter Day and Independence day are non-working holidays and a roster of special activities is lined up annually to mark the dual special occasion.

RODELSA Hall, operated by Liceo de Cagayan University, serves as a center for the performing arts. Concerts of many genres have been performed at RODELSA. Cine Europa (films) featuring European Union's cultures which include Austria, Belgium, Bulgaria, Czech Republic, Denmark, Finland, France, Germany, Hungary, Italy, Netherlands, Norway, Poland, Romania were shown at RODELSA.

Xavier Center for Culture and the Arts (XCCA), part of Xavier University - Ateneo de Cagayan, commissions and hosts culture and arts programs (Filipino and foreign, classical and contemporary).

In addition, the city is also the birthplace of Kadaiyahan festival, which claimed to be the first Mindanao-wide Pride March. Mindanao Pride, an emerging social movement that advocates for lesbian, gay, bisexual, transgender, and queer (LGBTQ+) rights and welfare in the island's regions. Kadaiyahan is the Visayan word for diversity and the lesbian, gay, bisexual, transgender, queer and intersex (LGBTQI) community. The LGBTQI are at the forefront of fighting for acceptance, not just tolerance in Philippine society.

Cuisine

Cagayan de Oro food cultures include a variety of world cuisines influenced by the city's immigrant history. Western and Austronesian immigrants have made the city famous for pastel bread, chicharrón and Hamon de Cagayan. Some mobile food vendors licensed by the city sell street food like kwek-kwek, fish balls, tempura and proven and grilled meat.

Cagayan de Oro has local, national, and foreign owned restaurants (Chinese and Korean cuisines), eateries, fast-foods, snack bars, bakeshops, and coffee shops that sprout all over the city.

Sports

Cagayan de Oro is the home of the Cagayan de Oro Stars and Cagayan de Oro Rapids basketball teams. This major teams of the city is member community of Mindanao Visayas Basketball Association, an amateur commercial basketball league in southern Philippines sanctioned by the country's National Sports Association for basketball, the Samahang Basketbol ng Pilipinas (SBP). It is also the home of "Holcim MoneyGram-Misamis Oriental" and "Holcim Pryce Pharma", which commencing the Misamis Oriental province. Aside from basketball, Cagayan de Oro is known for its oldest lawn tennis clubs like the "Golden Friendship Tennis Club". In addition, the city is ornamented with amateur volleyball teams like the Xavier University Volleyball Team.

The city was known for its leading sport, chess, one of the most common recreations by continuing championships in Mindanao since the 1990s. White water rafting and kayaking have annual sport events through the Cagayan River.

Sport venues include one of the biggest sports complex in Mindanao the Pelaez Memorial Sports Center, Xavier University-Ateneo de Cagayan Gymnasium, Liceo Civic Center, University of Science and Technology in Southern Philippine Gymnasium and others, a sports and entertainment complex that also hosts concerts. The Pelaez Memorial Sports Center serves as the home complex of Misamis Oriental sports teams.

Cagayan de Oro's new indoor sport is go-karting. The Speed Master Go Kart Race Track at SM City Carpark Building was the first race track in the city and in Mindanao. F1 Go Karts will be the second facility of its kind in the city and the first to use electric cars.

Infrastructure

Transportation

As the gateway to Northern Mindanao and the rest of Mindanao, Cagayan de Oro is accessible via land, air and water transportation.  Main public transportation systems within the city are metered taxis, jeepneys with fixed routes, and motorelas within the city. There have also been new additions of transportation such as trisikads(pedicabs), which can transport people within close ranges at an afford rate (roughly 14 PHP or $0.14). Vans have also been a new mode of transport which can take people outside of the city towards places like the Laguindingan airport, and other further places. In some areas of the city there are motorcycles that could take you to the much harder to get parts such as the mountainous areas.

Ports

The Port of Cagayan de Oro in Macabalan is located near the estuary of the Cagayan de Oro River. It has an anchorage depth of 18 meters and is around 400 meters from the shoreline. It has four large gantry cranes and the biggest international and domestic seaport in Mindanao. It handled 1.399 million metric tons of cargoes during the first quarter of 2016 to rank 3rd in the country after Manila's North Harbor with 5.557 million metric tons and MICT with 3.746 million metric tons. The Port of Cagayan de Oro increased its volume of cargoes by 9.7% from 2015. This is according to data from the Philippine Ports Authority (PPA).

The Port of Cagayan de Oro (Macabalan Port) serves regular trips to and from cities of Metro Manila, Cebu City, Tagbilaran, Bacolod, Dumaguete, Iloilo City and Jagna, Bohol.

General Milling and Del Monte Philippines also operate their own port facilities within Cagayan de Oro. The $85 million Mindanao International Container Port located in nearby town Tagoloan 17 kilometers from Cagayan de Oro serves the PHIVIDEC Industrial Estate. This city's sub-port connects Mindanao to the ports of major cities in Visayas, Batangas, Metro Manila and the rest of the world.

Airport

Cagayan de Oro's Laguindingan Airport (CGY), declared recently as the 7th hub of Cebu Pacific Airlines, handles domestic flights to and from Manila, Cebu City, Iloilo City, Davao City, Bacolod, Zamboanga City, Dumaguete, Tagbilaran and Clark in Angeles, Pampanga. It will serve international flights in the future. The airport was inaugurated on January 11, 2006, by then President Gloria Macapagal Arroyo, who advocated the idea of an international airport along the Cagayan de Oro-Iligan Corridor, and was officially opened on June 15, 2013.

Laguindingan International Airport is accessible by various modes of transportation provided by several transport operators from CDO and vice versa. These are ALPHAT Airport metered yellow taxi, regular metered taxi, and several shuttle express vans that run on an hourly basis (Magnum Express with its terminal at Limketkai Center, LAX Shuttle with its terminal at Ayala Centrio, Odyssey Airport Express with its terminal at SM CDO Downtown Premier, CAGATRANSCO, Glorymer Transport, Donsals Express, JTS, The Lord's Transport Services, Europcar, Super 5, CDOTRANSCO, Numano Express). All have booths near the parking area at Laguindingan Airport.

In 2019, the Civil Aviation Authority of the Philippines (CAAP) has granted Original Proponent Status (OPS) to Aboitiz InfraCapital, Inc. for its unsolicited proposal for the upgrade, expansion, operations, and maintenance of the Laguindingan Airport in Misamis Oriental. The P42.7 billion project involves capacity augmentation through expansion or construction of new passenger terminals, installation of required equipment, and enhancement and development of airside facilities.

Bus terminals

There are two bus terminals in the city: The Eastbound Integrated Bus Terminal also known as Market City and The Westbound Integrate Bus and Jeepney Termminal.

The Eastbound integrated Bus Terminal (Agora) also known as Market City offers regular landtrips to and from eastern municipalities of Misamis Oriental or eastern part of Mindanao including Balingoan and Gingoog, Carmen, Nasipit, Butuan (change buses travel to Surigao City), Bukidnon including Central or Southern portion of Mindanao such as Malaybalay and Valencia, Davao City, Kabacan, Tacurong and General Santos.
 
The Westbound Integrated Bus and Jeepney Terminal also has regular land trips to and from western municipalities of Misamis Oriental or Western part of Mindanao including El Salvador and Laguindingan, Iligan, Marawi, Tangub, Ozamiz, Dapitan, Dipolog, Cotabato City and the rest of Zamboanga Peninsula including Pagadian and Zamboanga City.

Public utilities 
Water services are provided by the Cagayan de Oro Water District (COWD), the first water district established in the entire Philippines. The Bulk Water Supply, a supply agreement between COWD and the contractor, has a total production capacity of 198,262 cubic metres per day, and comes from treated water from Cagayan de Oro river, the main water source of the city.

Electricity in the city is provided mainly by Cagayan Electric Power and Light Company (CEPALCO) and partly by Misamis Oriental 1st Rural Electric Service Cooperative (MORESCO-1). Cagayan Electric Power and Light Company (CEPALCO). CEPALCO, which began operations in 1952, covers almost all of Cagayan de Oro and the Municipalities of Tagoloan, Villanueva and Jasaan, all in the Province of Misamis Oriental, including the 3,000-hectare PHIVIDEC Industrial Estate and caters to more than 100,000 consumers. The company's distribution system network includes 138,000 volt, 69,000 volt, 34,500 volt and 13,800 volt systems. CEPALCO's power supply is mainly coming from embedded power generators, namely: 165MW-Coal Power Plant of Minergy Power Corporation in Balingasag, 46MW-Diesel Power Plants of Minergy in Tablon, 8MW-Cabulig Hydro Electric Power Plant in Claveria, 7MW-Bubunawan Hydro Power Plant in Baungon-Libona, Bukidnon, 12.5MW Kirahon Solar Power Plant in Villanueva. CEPALCO is also operating the Developing World's first and largest (at the time of its inauguration in 2004) on-grid solar photovoltaic power plant. The 1-megawatt polycrystalline silicon-based photovoltaic (PV) plant in Barangay Indahag of this city is connected with the distribution network of CEPALCO. It is the biggest solar power plant connected to the power grid in Southeast Asia. Misamis Oriental −1 Rural Electric Service Cooperative (MORESCO-1) whose office is located in Laguindingan covers remote parts of Cagayan de Oro. These are barangays Canitoan, Pagatpat, San Simon, and Baikingon.

Telecommunications are provided by PLDT, Philcom, Misortel, Globe, Smart, and Sun.

Law and order

Cagayan de Oro is the regional base of the Philippine Air Force, Philippine Army, and Philippine National Police in Northern Mindanao. Lumbia Airport is currently used as an air base, operating service equipment such as OV-10 Bronco aircraft, UH-1 Huey, and MD-520MG Defender helicopters. The 15th Air Strike Wing from Sangley Point, Cavite will be moved to Lumbia Airport.

The Philippine Army operates the largest military camp in Mindanao located in Barangay Patag with an area of 129 hectares. Camp Evangelista is home to the 4th infantry division of the Philippine Army. The camp's external jurisdiction covers the Northern Mindanao and Caraga regions. Minor military camps are also located in Barangay Lumbia and Upper Puerto.

The Philippine National Police (PNP) operates its Regional Headquarters at Camp Alagar in Barangay Lapasan. Camp Alagar has jurisdiction over the entirety of Northern Mindanao, namely the provinces of Bukidnon, Camiguin, Lanao del Norte, Misamis Occidental and Misamis Oriental including its major cities; Cagayan de Oro and Iligan. The PNP and AFP, with the help of Cagayan de Oro's local government unit formed a new integrated security force named Task Force Oro.

Cagayan de Oro upgraded its emergency services on October 30, 2017. Dialing the 911 will immediately link the call to CDRRMC, utilizing computer-aided emergency response. The city patterned its improved emergency response program after Davao City's central 911 emergency call.

The Judiciary's Court of Appeals holds office in Cagayan de Oro. The Court of Appeals of the Philippines is the Philippines' second-highest judicial court. Cagayan de Oro's Court of Appeals has 3 divisions covering all of Mindanao.

Health
Cagayan de Oro has a hospital bed-to-population ratio of 1:474 as of 2003. The Justiniano R. Borja General Hospital (a.k.a. City Hospital), the Camp Evangelista Station Hospital (Phil. Army), and Northern Mindanao Medical Center (formerly Provincial Hospital) are the three government-run hospitals.

Capitol University Medical City, Polymedic General Hospital, Polymedic Medical Plaza, Maria Reyna–Xavier University Hospital, Cagayan de Oro Medical Center, Madonna and Child Hospital, Sabal Hospital, Puerto Community Hospital, and Maternity-Children's Hospital and Puericulture Center (formerly Oro Doctor's Hospital) are privately owned.

A special medical facility for drug-abuse treatment and rehabilitation is the Department of Health-Treatment and Rehabilitation Center-Cagayan de Oro located at Upper Puerto, Barangay Puerto.

Many of these government-owned and privately owned hospital facilities have undergone expansion, renovation and modernization.

Education

The city has five major private universities/colleges: Xavier University – Ateneo de Cagayan, Capitol University, Liceo de Cagayan University, Lourdes College, and Cagayan de Oro College. The University of Science and Technology of Southern Philippines is the only state university in the city. Other higher education institutions include Southern Philippines College, Pilgrim Christian College, St. Mary's Academy of Carmen run by the RVM Sisters, Informatics College Mindanao and STI College – Cagayan de Oro with Senior High School programs. There are also a number of foreign schools in the city with study programs.

Notable public and private elementary and high schools include Cagayan de Oro National High School, Bulua National High School, Misamis Oriental General Comprehensive High School, Gusa Regional Science High School - X, City Central School, St. Mary's School, Corpus Christi School, The Abba's Orchard Montessori School, Merry Child School, International School, Marymount Academy, Vineyard International Polytechnic College, and Montessori de Oro. There are also schools in Cagayan de Oro that use the Accelerated Christian Education system. Two of these schools include Cavite Bible Baptist Academy-CDO branch, and Shekinah Glory Christian Academy. There are two Chinese schools in the city: Kong Hua School (Roman Catholic) and Oro Christian Grace School (an Evangelical Christian school). There are two international schools run by Koreans, namely: Nanuri International School and Immanuel Mission International School.

Notable personalities

Ivana Alawi – actress
Chanda Romero – actress
Rufus Rodriguez – congressman
Martin Andanar – Secretary of the Presidential Communications Operations Office under President Rodrigo Duterte
Mark Bautista – singer, songwriter, theater actor
Sheree Bautista – member of Viva Hot Babes
Maymay Entrata – Pinoy Big Brother: Lucky 7 Big Winner
Poy Erram – PBA player (NLEX Road Warriors)
Jio Jalalon – PBA player (Star Hotshots)
Pete Lacaba – poet, writer and journalist
Emmanuel Lacaba – poet, writer and activist
Carlo Lastimosa – PBA player (NLEX Road Warriors)
Jojo Lastimosa – retired PBA Player
Maria Isabel Lopez – Binibining Pilipinas Universe
Milan Melindo – professional boxer
Antonio Julian Montalvan – a social anthropologist, historian, and heritage activist.
Ciso Morales – professional boxer
Jose Montalvan – World War II military officer
Rey Nambatac – PBA player (Rain or Shine)
Carlo Paalam – Olympic medalist boxer
Albert Pagara – professional boxer
Jason Pagara – professional boxer
Philip Paniamogan – PBA player (NLEX Road Warriors)
Aquilino "Nene" Pimentel Jr – former Senate President
Aquilino "Koko" Pimentel III – Senate President under President Rodrigo Duterte
Maricar Reyes – actress
Mariano Vélez – boxer
Pia Wurtzbach – Miss Universe Philippines 2015, Miss Universe 2015
Jonaxx – author

Sister cities

Cagayan de Oro currently has four local and five international sister cities, as classified by the city government.

Local

 Quezon City
 Surigao City (1984)

 Iligan City
 Imus City, Cavite (2019)

International

  Lawndale, California, United States (1986)
  Tainan City, Taiwan (2005)
  Harbin, Heilongjiang, China (2007)

  Norfolk, Virginia, United States (2008)
  Gwangyang, Jeollanam-do, South Korea (n/a)

Gallery

See also

 List of renamed cities and municipalities in the Philippines
 List of tallest buildings in Cagayan de Oro

References

External links

 
 
 [ Philippine Standard Geographic Code]
 LGU Performance Management System

 
1871 establishments in the Philippines
Cities in Misamis Oriental
Highly urbanized cities in the Philippines
Populated coastal places in the Philippines
Populated places established in 1626
Port cities and towns in the Philippines
Provincial capitals of the Philippines
Late Neolithic